E. Henry Powell (September 3, 1839 – May 4, 1911) was a Vermont veteran of the Civil War and politician who served as State Auditor.

Biography
Edward Henry Powell was born in Richford, Vermont on September 3, 1839, a son of Hermon Powell and Julia (White) Powell. He was educated in Richford and at Potsdam Academy in New York and New Hampton Institute in Fairfax, Vermont. Powell worked as a teacher for several terms while he was attending school.

In 1860, Powell began studies at the University of Vermont, where he remained until withdrawing to enlist for the Civil War. He enlisted as a Private in the 10th Vermont Infantry Regiment on July 17, 1862, and was soon promoted to First Sergeant.

In 1863, he passed a competitive examination and a promotion board to receive an officer's appointment in the United States Colored Troops. He was commissioned as a Lieutenant Colonel in the 10th United States Colored Troops and served with this unit until the end of the war. After the Civil War ended in 1865 the 10th U.S.C.T. performed duty in Texas as part of a separate brigade, and Powell often acted as brigade commander.

After being mustered out Powell returned to Vermont, studied law and was admitted to the bar in 1866.

A Republican, Powell served as a federal customs inspector for Franklin County from 1866 to 1869. From 1872 to 1874, he was Franklin County State's Attorney. He served in the Vermont House of Representatives from 1874 to 1876, and in the Vermont Senate from 1878 to 1880.

In 1874, Powell was an original incorporator of the Richford Savings Bank & Trust Company, and was named its President.

In 1878, Powell was elected State Auditor, and he served until 1892. In 1883, he received the honorary degree of master of arts from the University of Vermont.

Powell moved to Burlington in 1892 to accept the position of Treasurer at the University of Vermont. In 1892, he was also elected to the Board of Directors of the Burlington Trust Company.

Powell died in Burlington on May 4, 1911.  He was buried in Burlington's Lakeview Cemetery.

Family
In 1865, Powell married Ellen Grace Rowell, a music teacher. The were the parents of two children, Max L. Powell and Blanche Powell Spring. Ellen Powell died in 1876 and in 1877 he married Georgiana Reed Bailey, the widow of George W. Bailey Jr., who had served as Secretary of State of Vermont. With his second wife Powell was the father of two children, Thomas Reed Powell and Gertrude Powell Morris.

Max L. Powell served as President pro tempore of the Vermont State Senate. Thomas Reed Powell (1880–1955) was a professor at Columbia and Harvard Law Schools and president of the American Political Science Association.

References

External links

1839 births
1911 deaths
University of Vermont alumni
State Auditors of Vermont
Vermont lawyers
State's attorneys in Vermont
People from Franklin County, Vermont
Politicians from Burlington, Vermont
Republican Party Vermont state senators
Republican Party members of the Vermont House of Representatives
People of Vermont in the American Civil War
19th-century American politicians
Burials at Lakeview Cemetery (Burlington, Vermont)
19th-century American lawyers